Franz-Josef Berners (born March 27, 1945) is a German politician of the Christian Democratic Union (CDU) and former member of the German Bundestag.

Life 
Berners joined the CDU in 1971 and became a member of Leverkusen city council in 1975. Following the death of Helga Wex, he moved to the German Bundestag in 1986, where he remained until the end of the tenth term in 1987. During this period he was a member of the Committee on Legal Affairs and a deputy member of the Committee on Research and Technology.

Literature

References

1945 births
Members of the Bundestag for North Rhine-Westphalia
Members of the Bundestag 1983–1987
Members of the Bundestag for the Christian Democratic Union of Germany
Living people